Chimmaidlai is a village in the southern state of Karnataka, India. It is located in Chincholi taluk of Kalburgi district. According to the 2011 census of India, this village has population of 3071, where 1555 are males and 1516 are females.

Education Institutions
The school in Chimmaidlai is

Government higher primary school chimmaidlai.

Agriculture
Major crops produced in Chimmaidlai are Pigeon pea, Sorghum, Pearl millet, chickpea, mung bean, vigna mungo.

Transport
KSRTC bus facility available to travel within the Karnataka state and nabor states. The nearest railway station is (37 km) Tandur railway station and nearest airport is (150 km) Rajiv Gandhi International Airport Hyderabad.

References

Villages in Kalaburagi district